The Funhouse is a 1981 American slasher film  directed by Tobe Hooper, written by Larry Block and starring Elizabeth Berridge, Kevin Conway, William Finley, Cooper Huckabee, Miles Chapin, Largo Woodruff, Wayne Doba, and Sylvia Miles. The film's plot concerns four teenagers who become trapped in a dark ride at a local carnival in Iowa and are stalked by a mentally disabled murderous carnie.

Released by Universal Pictures, the film was director Hooper's first major studio production after Eaten Alive (1976) and The Texas Chain Saw Massacre (1974). Upon its release on March 13, 1981, it was a commercial failure, but received mixed to positive reviews from critics.

Plot
In small-town Iowa, a masked intruder attacks teenager Amy as she showers. The attacker turns out to be her younger brother Joey, a horror film fan, and his weapon is a fake rubber prop knife.

Against her father's wishes, Amy visits a sleazy traveling carnival with her new boyfriend Buzz, her best friend Liz, and Liz's irresponsible boyfriend Richie. At the carnival, the four teens smoke marijuana, peep into a 21-and-over strip show, heckle fortune teller Madame Zena, visit the freaks-of-nature exhibit, and view a magic show.

Richie dares the group to spend the night in "The Funhouse", which is actually a dark ride. After the park closes, the teenagers settle down inside the funhouse. Through a grate to a room below the attraction, the teenagers witness the ride assistant, a silent man in a Frankenstein's Monster mask, engage Zena as a prostitute. He experiences premature ejaculation, but despite his request, Zena will not return her $100 fee. He murders her in a violent rage.

The teenagers try to leave, but find themselves locked inside the funhouse. As they attempt to escape, Richie secretly steals the money from the safe from which the masked assistant took Zena's fee. The funhouse's barker, Conrad Straker, discovers what his son Gunther Twibunt (the masked assistant) has done to Zena. Conrad also realizes that the money is missing. Thinking Gunther took it, he attacks him. Gunther's face is revealed to be gruesomely deformed via Albinism and Frontonasal dysplasia with sharp protruding teeth, long white thinning hair, red eyes, and a cleft running up the bridge up his nose.

The teens see this, and Conrad realizes someone is watching after Richie's lighter falls on the floor from the ceiling he and the others were hiding in. Buzz concludes that Richie has the money. Richie insists that he would have split the money with the others. Despite Liz wanting to return the money, Buzz knows it is too late since they are now in danger. Conrad stalks the funhouse to eliminate any witnesses and heckles Gunther into a murderous rage. The teens arm themselves with the various funhouse props as weapons.

Richie is hanged with a rope by Conrad, and the remaining three witness his corpse riding through on a cart. Liz, hysterical, falls through a trap door and is confronted by Gunther. She stabs him with a dagger, and he kills her by pushing her head through an industrial exhaust fan. Buzz stabs Conrad to death when he confronts him and Amy, but is then killed by Gunther. During a showdown between final girl Amy and Gunther in the funhouse's maintenance area, Gunther is electrocuted and crushed to death between two spinning gears.

As dawn breaks, the traumatized sole survivor Amy emerges from the funhouse and heads home as the animatronic fat lady perched atop the entrance laughs mockingly at her.

Cast

Themes
In the 2021 book American Twilight: The Cinema of Tobe Hooper, writers Kristopher Woofter and Will Dodson note a recurring theme throughout The Funhouse of a world in which adults mistreat and look down upon teenagers, characterizing them as "a corrupt cabal disenfranchising the young."

Production
The Funhouse was written by Larry Block, and the script was purchased by Universal Pictures, who were looking to produce a teen-aimed horror film after the success of Paramount's Friday the 13th (1980).

Filming
Though set in the American Midwest in Iowa, The Funhouse was shot on the backlots of Norin Studios in Miami, Florida. The amusement rides and attractions featured in the film, which date from the 1940s and 1950s, were acquired from a defunct carnival in Akron, Ohio.

Release
The Funhouse opened in 814 theaters in the United States on March 13, 1981. It was released in some locations with the subtitle Carnival of Terror.

Box office
At the United States box office, The Funhouse earned $2,765,456 in its opening weekend and went on to gross $7,886,857 in total.

Critical response
On the review aggregator website Rotten Tomatoes, The Funhouse holds a 67% approval rating based on 21 critic reviews, with an average rating of 6.2/10. Tobe Hooper was specifically praised for bringing style and suspense to what could have been a standard early-1980s blood and gore-focused horror film, and his work here was largely responsible for him getting the job of directing the original Poltergeist movie. Film critic Gene Siskel of the Chicago Tribune liked the film and gave it a positive review.

John Corry of The New York Times gave the film a middling review, noting: "At times, in fact, Mr. Hooper almost persuades us that he is up to more than just gore, creepiness and trauma. He has photographed a carnival - freak show, girly show, grifters and geeks -with a sense of style. The carnival is a small vision of middle-America gone sour, reveling in mean gaiety, and it is not bad while it lasts. Then the monster comes in and drools." Varietys review of the film was similarly mixed: "For all the elegance of photography, [the] pic has nothing in particular up its sleeves, and devotees of director Tobe Hooper’s The Texas Chain Saw Massacre will be particularly disappointed with the almost total lack of shocks and mayhem."

In a review published in People, the film was praised: "While the director, Tobe (The Texas Chainsaw Massacre) Hooper, ought to have moved on to better things, he is the master of this gore-and-sadism genre... The film features an excruciatingly tense final confrontation. Alex Keneas of Newsday also gave the film a positive review: "The Funhouse doesn't trade on gratuitous and graphic gore, but it doesn't have to. In little ways and using the traditional tried and true devices of the genre ... it skillfully heightens expectations [and] nicely evokes the chiller of a bygone era as it pays respect to Hitchcock and James Whale."

John Beal's horror-themed musical score for The Funhouse was praised by critics. The film's soundtrack album's CD became a collector's item.

Home media

The film was unsuccessfully prosecuted as a video nasty in the United Kingdom a few years after its release. Some commentators have questioned its attempted banning, given that the film is fairly tame in comparison to other entries on the list, leading some to suggest it was mistakenly chosen instead of the infamous Last House on Dead End Street, which was released under an alternative title The Fun House and did not appear on the list. The film received a special edition Blu-ray disc in the United Kingdom on July 18, 2011, by Arrow Video.

In the United States, GoodTimes Entertainment released The Funhouse on VHS and DVD in 1998 and 1999, respectively. Universal Home Entertainment released a DVD edition in 2004.

In October 2012, Shout! Factory released the film on Blu-ray and DVD in a special collector's edition under their horror sub-label, Scream Factory. A 4K Ultra HD Blu-ray edition featuring newly-conducted interviews with cast and crew members was released by Scream Factory on September 12, 2022.

Novelization

A novelization of the screenplay was written by Dean Koontz, under the pseudonym Owen West. As the film production took longer than expected, the book was released before the film. The novel contains a great deal of backstory and characterization which was not used in the film.

Notes

References

Sources

External links
 
 
 
 
 
 

1981 films
1981 horror films
1980s horror thriller films
1980s serial killer films
1980s teen horror films
American monster movies
American teen horror films
Circus films
Films about sideshow performers
Films directed by Tobe Hooper
Films shot in Miami
Films set in Iowa
Video nasties
American slasher films
American serial killer films
American exploitation films
1980s English-language films
1980s American films
1980s slasher films